Hakeem is an Arabic-language given name, a romanization variant of Hakim. It can also be used as a surname. Notable people with the name include:

Given name
Hakeem Abdul-Saboor
Hakeem Abdul-Shaheed
Hakeem Adeniji
Hakeem al-Araibi 
Hakeem Ali Mohammad
Hakeem Achour
Hakeem Araba
Hakeem Belo-Osagie
Hakeem Butler
Hakeem Dawodu
Hakeem Fateh Mohammad Sehwani
Hakeem Femi Gbajabiamila
Hakeem Jeffries
Hakeem Kae-Kazim
Hakeem Kashama
Hakeem Khaaliq
Hakeem Manzoor
Hakeem Muhammad Akhtar
Hakeem Muhammad Saeed
Hakeem Muri-Okunola
Hakeem Nicks
Hakeem Noor-ud-Din
Hakeem Odoffin
Hakeem Olajuwon
Hakeem Oluseyi
Hakeem Rizwan Hafeez Malik
Hakeem Shaker 
Hakeem Valles
Hakeem Yasin

Surname
Adam Hakeem
Amer Hakeem
Ayman Hakeem
Rauff Hakeem
Yusuf Hakeem
Zayn Hakeem

Fictional characters
Hakeem Lyon

See also

Hakim (disambiguation)
Abdul Hakim

Arabic masculine given names